Rawhide is an unincorporated community in Placer County, California, United States. It lies at an elevation of 2175 feet (663 m).

References

Unincorporated communities in California
Unincorporated communities in Placer County, California